Defeat American Aggression Badge is a military badge given during the Vietnam War by North Vietnam. established in 1965 and given during the Vietnam War by North Vietnam. The badge was awarded to units and individuals who performed outstanding services against American forces. This included any individual, who took part in combat after August 2, 1964

References 

Military awards and decorations of Vietnam
Vietnam War